is a Japanese science fiction yuri manga created by Akihito Yoshitomi. It comprises five chapters that were serialized in the shōnen manga magazine Dengeki Comic Gao! from June 2004 to December 2005, and later collected into a single volume. In 2007, Yoshitomi began to work on a new Blue Drop manga, titled , which was serialized in the manga magazine Champion Red between February 19, 2007 and January 19, 2008, with its 14 chapters later compiled into 2 volumes. Each volume contained a chapter of another series called  where Kasagi is a member of an alien race of females called the Arume. She spends her time playing matchmaker for unsuspecting, cute human girls. The third and fourth chapters were not released until 2008.

A Blue Drop anime series directed by Masahiko Ohkura and produced by Asahi Production and BeSTACK aired in Japan between October 2 and December 25, 2007 under the title . The first DVD release on December 26, 2007 was accompanied with a bonus 6-chapter manga volume called . In 2008, two drama CDs were released. The first, released on May 23, was titled Lover Side, and included the third chapter of Tenshi no Itazura. The second, released on June 27, was titled Traitor Side, and included the fourth and final chapter of the Itazura one-shot series.

Both manga series are set after the war while the anime is set before. The two manga series feature some degree of sexual content; the second manga being considerably more explicit than the original one.

Plot
The war against the Arume is set from 2000 to 2008, ending with the aliens winning the conflict. In 2009 the aliens take control of the Japanese government, which sets the backstory for the Blue Drop storylines.

Manga
The decisive factor in the Arumes victory is the use of biological weapons and a modified version of an alien toy called . Along the years, the remnants of this weaponry have become dangerous creatures which the government (run by the aliens) has to deal with. This is the main premise of the original Blue Drop manga, which is set around a thousand years after the war. The military uses an experimental vaccine that gives human children special abilities for a determined period of time. During this time the military forces them to confront the weapon remnants, an action that usually ends up in the children's death. Most of the chapters follow the conflict between the military and the resistance, which tries to save those who have been given the vaccine, as well as the relationships between the people involved. In addition, the story introduces the aliens' traits and behavior. All of them have blue eyes and their blood turns milky white when it touches air, but their main characteristic lies in their gender: they are all female, and their sexual orientation is homosexual.

The aliens' sexual behaviour is dealt with even more prominently (and explicitly) in the Blue Drop: Tenshi no Bokura manga, which shows its consequences upon the human social structure. This manga also deals with the first experiments done on human beings by the aliens; specifically experiments concerning sex change. Set one year after the war, it focuses in the relationship between Shōta, a normal high-school student, and Kenzō, Shōta's former-male best friend who has been turned into a girl by the aliens.

Anime

Unlike both manga stories, the Blue Drop: Tenshitachi no Gikyoku anime series is set before the war. The storyline starts in 1999, with Mari Wakatake transferring to a girl's dormitory school called . Mari's background hides a traumatic past: five years before her arrival at Kaihō, all the inhabitants of the island where she lived died in one night. Mari was the only survivor, but lost all her memories prior that point. At the Academy, Mari meets Hagino Senkōji, the school idol and class rep. Although Hagino is introduced as a calm and collected person, when she touches Mari's hand she panics and attempts to strangle Mari. From then on, Mari is torn between anger and attraction towards Hagino, who pretends as if nothing had happened. Unknown to Mari, Hagino is actually the commander of an alien battleship called Blue, which is the vanguard of the invasion to Earth. The incident on the island where Mari lived occurred when the crew of the ship and the island's inhabitants killed each other. Blue was seriously damaged and hidden, and Hagino blended into human society and continued her reconnaissance.

The story focuses on the relationship between Mari and Hagino; as Mari begins to come out of her shell, Hagino, who has been living a double life, gradually begins to have doubts about her mission. While the invasion and war draw closer unnoticed, they begin to understand each other.

Characters

Although most of the chapters in the original Blue Drop manga are auto-conclusive, the first recurrent character and main protagonist is Yui, an alien/human hybrid introduced as a member of the resistance. Because of her alien heritage, Yui possesses their characteristic blue eyes, the white-colored blood, and their sexual orientation.

At the beginning of the story, Shōta is met by a girl who asks him to have sex with her. Not much time passes until Shōta finds out this girl is actually , his former-male best friend, who has had his sex changed by the aliens and has been commanded to get pregnant.

After the incident on the island, Mari is taken in by her grandmother, who has her educated by tutors at home. Eventually, knowing that she herself may not have long to live, her grandmother enrolls Mari in Kaihō Academy. Enrolled against her will, she misses her home, and can not hide her distress and anger. Hagino, on the other hand, is calm and collected, an excellent student, and an all-round athlete. Despite being very popular among her classmates, however, she never shows emotion, surrounding herself with an aura of mystery.

Media

Manga
Written and illustrated by Akihito Yoshitomi, the original Blue Drop manga was serialized in the Japanese shōnen magazine Dengeki Comic Gao!, published by MediaWorks. The manga was initially a collection of five one-shot stories: the first chapter was called , and was published on June 27, 2004; the second chapter followed on December 27, 2004 under the title ; the third release was on July 27, 2005, and was titled ; the fourth chapter, called , was released on October 27, 2005; and the final one, was published on December 27, 2005. The five chapters were later collected into a single bound volume which went on sale on January 27, 2006. In the volume release, the order of the chapters was altered: Kaminoko was first, followed by Kowareta Tenshi, then Kaijin, Tenshi no Yakusoku, and finally Tenshi no Sentaku.

Yoshitomi's second Blue Drop manga, titled Blue Drop: Tenshi no Bokura, was serialized in the magazine Champion Red (published by Akita Shoten) between February 19, 2007 and January 19, 2008. Subsequently, a two-chapter story called  (also by Yoshitomi) was published in Champion Reds sister magazine Champion Red Ichigo; the first chapter being released on June 5, 2007 and the second one on October 5, 2007. The first part was later included as a special chapter in the first volume of Blue Drop: Tenshi no Bokura, which was released on September 20, 2007. The second part was included in the second (and last) volume of Blue Drop: Tenshi no Bokura, released on March 19, 2008.

Radio drama
A Blue Drop radio drama was broadcast in Japan from July to September 2007. The drama aired every Monday on fm osaka, starting at 12:30 AM and running for twenty-eight minutes at a time. It focused on the original manga's storyline and featured Kaori Nazuka as Yui, Mami Kosuge as Misato, and Ryoko Nagata as Shōko. The radio drama was released as two drama CDs called Blue Drop vol.1 Lovers Side and Blue Drop vol.2 Traitor Side, on May 23 and June 27, 2008 respectively.

Anime

After a year and a half of planning, Asahi Production and BeSTACK produced the Blue Drop anime series. Directed by Masahiko Ohkura, the show aired in Japan between October 2, 2007, and December 25, 2007 containing thirteen episodes. The series featured character design by Itsuko Takeda, series composition by Natsuko Takahashi, and screenplay by Akihito Yoshitomi and Masahiko Ohkura themselves. 3D modeling was done by studio Gonzo.

The soundtrack was composed by The Kintsuru, providing mostly orchestral music, with violin and piano pieces. A single containing both songs was released on October 24, 2007.

The anime has been licensed for release in North America by Sentai Filmworks and is distributed by Section23 Films. The complete collection was released on November 17, 2009 with English subtitles. Sentai Filmworks re-released Blue Drop with a dub on DVD on September 7, 2010. The Anime Network began airing the dub of Blue Drop on Anime Network On Demand on July 22, 2010 and on the Anime Network Online Player on July 23, 2010.

Voice cast

Reception
Reviews were generally positive. Allen Moody of T.H.E.M. Anime Reviews praised the series for its visual design, interesting technology, strong dramatic aspects, the sequence in one of the episodes where Hagino invites Mari aboard her ship, and "really nice quiet moments" between Hagino and Mari. However, he argued that more time in the anime could have been used to "develop the Mari/Hagino relationship" or the backstory of Hagino and Ekaril, and wished that the ending has been less conventional. Theron Martin of Anime News Network argued that the series resembled Darker than Black'' with its "common gimmicks and story elements" like lesbian love, a play, and lost memory. Even so, he argued that the show succeeds because it is "more about the characters than the gimmicks," is a "low-key series" and called it a "nearly-overlooked gem of a story" which will not have as big of an audience as it should have.

References

External links
Official website 

Review of anime at Anime News Network

2000s LGBT literature
2004 manga
2007 Japanese television series debuts
2007 Japanese television series endings
2007 manga
Akita Shoten manga
Alien invasions in comics
Asahi Production
ASCII Media Works manga
Dengeki Comic Gao!
Dengeki Comics
Extraterrestrials in anime and manga
Japanese LGBT-related animated television series
LGBT speculative fiction television series
Science fiction anime and manga
Sentai Filmworks
Shōnen manga
Yuri (genre) anime and manga